Hordeum capense is a species of wild barley native to South Africa and Lesotho. An allotetraploid, it arose from ancestors with the Xa and I Hordeum genomes.

References

capense
Plants described in 1794